Tad, the Lost Explorer and the Emerald Tablet, released in the UK as Tad the Lost Explorer and the Curse of the Mummy, and in Australia as Tad the Explorer: The Mummy Adventure is a 2022 Spanish computer-animated comedy film directed by Enrique Gato and written by Josep Gatell and Manuel Burque. It is a follow-up to Tad, the Lost Explorer and Tad the Lost Explorer and the Secret of King Midas.

Plot 
Clumsy archaeologist Tadeo ('Tad') breaks a sarcophagus and sets on a spell endangering his friends, and so they embark on an adventure that takes them to places such as Mexico, Paris, and Chicago.

Voice cast

Spanish track

English 
 Trevor White as Tad Stones
 Alex Kelly as Sara
 Joseph Balderrama as Mummy

Production 
The film is a Telecinco Cinema, Lightbox Animation Studios, Ikiru Films, Anangu Grup and La Tadeopelícula AIE production, and it had the participation of Mediaset España, Movistar Plus+, and Mediterráneo Mediaset España Group. It was written by Josep Gatell and Manuel Burque. Produced by Dabruk, the film's main theme ("Si tú me llamas") was performed by Omar Montes and Belinda. The film had a reported budget of €11 million.

Release 
Distributed worldwide by Paramount Pictures, the film opened in French theatres on 24 August 2022. It was then theatrically released in Spain on 26 August 2022. It became the highest-grossing film of the weekend at the Spanish box office, also having, up to that point in the year, both the 2nd-largest opening weekend for any animated film (after Minions: The Rise of Gru) and the 2nd-largest opening weekend for any Spanish film (after Father There Is Only One 3). It opened in the UK and Ireland on 9 September 2022 under the title Tad the Lost Explorer and the Curse of the Mummy, also distributed by Paramount.

Reception 
Rubén Romero Santos of Cinemanía rated the film 4 out of 5 stars writing that "the planning of the constant action scenes is remarkable, a technical prodigy that places Spanish animation at the forefront".

Beatriz Martínez of El Periódico de Catalunya rated the film 3 out of 5 stars, assessing that it manages to reach "a greater degree of virtuosity" [than the previous two films], with its plot being "better articulated, its structure is more agile, it is more adventurous, funnier and has better ideas".

María Bescós of HobbyConsolas rated the film 60 out of 100 points ("acceptable"), deeming it to be an improvement from the previous installments of the saga, while still citing the "predictable" plot, the "simplistic" humor, and some additional work to do with the animation as negative points.

Javier Ocaña of El País found the film to be "the most refined [out of the three installments]", with the portrayal of Tadeo being the most surprising element, otherwise highlighting the "outstanding dubbing work throughout the three films [delivered] by Óscar Barberán, [featuring] a beautiful voice full of nuances in tone".

Mike McCahill of The Guardian rated the film 3 out of 5 stars underscoring how "[it] is never more than inessential screen filler, but agreeably jolly with it – partly as it does have some idea of how to fill a screen".

Accolades 

|-
| align = "center" rowspan = "4" | 2023 
| rowspan = "2" | 15th Gaudí Awards || colspan = "2" | Best Animated Film ||  || rowspan = "2" | 
|-
| Best Visual Effects || David Blanco || 
|-
| 78th CEC Medals || colspan = "2" | Best Animated Film ||  || 
|-
| 37th Goya Awards
| colspan = "2" | Best Animated Film
| 
| align = "center" | 
|}

See also 
 List of Spanish films of 2022

References

2022 films
2022 3D films
2022 comedy films
2022 adventure films
2022 computer-animated films
2020s Spanish films
2020s adventure comedy films
2020s English-language films
2020s Spanish-language films
Spanish 3D films
Spanish computer-animated films
Spanish adventure comedy films
Animated adventure films
Animated comedy films
3D animated films
English-language Spanish films
Films set in Chicago
Films set in Mexico
Animated films set in Paris
Films set in 2022
Films scored by Zacarías M. de la Riva
Paramount Pictures films
Paramount Pictures animated films
Telecinco Cinema films
Ikiru Films films